Croatian Armed Forces may refer to:

 Armed Forces of the Republic of Croatia, the Croatian military.
 Croatian Armed Forces (Independent State of Croatia), the military of the World War II Axis puppet state